The 1991 Temple Owls football team represented Temple University in the 1991 NCAA Division I-A football season. They were part of the Big East, placing last in the conference with a season record of two wins, nine losses.

Schedule

References

Temple
Temple Owls football seasons
Temple Owls football